Edouard Henri Mercier (1816 – 1886) was the French ambassador to the United States from July 1860 through December 1863 during the American Civil War (1861–1865). He is most noted for playing a key diplomatic role in the Trent Affair.

Mercier was born in Baltimore, the son of a French diplomat stationed in America. During the Civil War, he was generally thought of as leaning pro-South, visiting Richmond in 1862, and proposing a common market between the southern states and France. However, after the Emancipation Proclamation and subsequent change in favor towards the Federals among the French and British public, he brought an offer from Napoleon III to mediate an end the war in 1863. This was angrily rejected by Secretary of State William H. Seward. Seeing little headway being made he asked to be reassigned to Spanish relations in 1863.

A full biography of Mercier was written by Daniel B. Carroll in 1971 titled Henri Mercier and the American Civil War.

References 

French diplomats
1816 births
1886 deaths
People from Baltimore